Frank Newman Speller III, (July 24, 1938 in Tyler, TX – May 15, 2017 in Austin, TX) was an Associate Professor Emeritus of Organ at the University of Texas at Austin. He has appeared in recitals in Europe, the US, on National Public Radio, and in one national and three regional conventions of the American Guild of Organists.

His organ and choral compositions are published by various American editors, and two commercial compact discs of his works have been released by Albany and Pro Organo. Speller was integral in developing the Visser-Rowland organ of UT Austin, the largest American-built tracker organ when it was completed in 1981 (several much larger foreign-built tracker organs already existed in the US). He holds a D.M.A., University of Colorado; Performer’s Certificate, Indiana University, and studied in Paris with Jeanne Demessieux.

He is the grandson of Frank Newman Speller, Sr.

References

External links
Speller biography

Year of birth missing (living people)
Living people
American organists
American male organists
University of Colorado alumni
Indiana University alumni
University of Texas at Austin faculty
21st-century American keyboardists
21st-century organists
21st-century American male musicians